'''2021 Nigeria boat accident may refer to:

Kebbi boat disaster in May
Bagwai boat disaster in November